Isicabu is a genus of African araneomorph spiders in the family Cyatholipidae, and was first described by C. E. Griswold in 1987.

Species
 it contains five species:
Isicabu henriki Griswold, 2001 – Tanzania
Isicabu kombo Griswold, 2001 – Tanzania
Isicabu margrethae Griswold, 2001 – Tanzania
Isicabu reavelli Griswold, 1987 (type) – South Africa
Isicabu zuluensis Griswold, 1987 – South Africa

References

Araneomorphae genera
Cyatholipidae
Spiders of Africa